is a passenger railway station in located in the city of Tsu,  Mie Prefecture, Japan, operated by the private railway operator Kintetsu Railway.

Lines
Tsu-Shimmachi Station is served by the Nagoya Line, and is located 86.6 rail kilometers from the starting point of the line at Kintetsu Nagoya Station.

Station layout
The station was consists of one side platform and one island platform serving three tracks. Platform 3 is used for trains which terminate at this station.

Platforms

Adjacent stations

History
Tsu-Shimmachi Station opened on July 4, 1931, as a station on the Sangu Express Electric Railway's Tsu Line. The Tsu Line was renamed the Nagoya Line on December 7, 1938. On March 15, 1941, the Sangu Express Electric Railway merged with Osaka Electric Railway to become a station on Kansai Express Railway's Nagoya Line. This line in turn was merged with the Nankai Electric Railway on June 1, 1944, to form Kintetsu. The station building was rebuilt in 1970, with underpasses connecting the platforms.

Passenger statistics
In fiscal 2019, the station was used by an average of 6966 passengers daily (boarding passengers only).

Surrounding area
Tsu City Office
Tsu Chuo Post Office 
 Mie Prefectural Tsu High School
 Mie Prefectural Tsu Technical High School
 Tsu City Nishikyonai Junior High School

See also
List of railway stations in Japan

References

External links

 Kintetsu: Tsu-Shimmachi Station

Railway stations in Japan opened in 1931
Railway stations in Mie Prefecture
Stations of Kintetsu Railway
Tsu, Mie